The 2013–14 Texas Tech Red Raiders basketball team represented Texas Tech University in the 2013–14 NCAA Division I men's basketball season. The team was led by head coach Tubby Smith, who brought in a whole new coaching staff for his first season. The Red Raiders played their home games at the United Spirit Arena in Lubbock, Texas and were members of the Big 12 Conference.

Joining Smith as assistant coaches for the 2013–14 season were Joe Esposito, Alvin "Pooh" Williamson, and Vince Taylor.

The Red Raiders finished the season 14–18, 6–12 in Big 12 play to finish in ninth place. They lost in the first round of the Big 12 tournament to Oklahoma State.

Pre-season

Departures
PG Josh Gray (Transfer)

PG Ty Nurse (Graduated)

Recruits
The recruiting section will be filled in on Friday afternoon or Saturday morning.

Schedule

|-
!colspan=12 style="background:#CC0000; color:black;"| Exhibition

|-
!colspan=12 style="background:#CC0000; color:black;"| Non-conference regular season

|-
!colspan=12 style="background:#CC0000; color:black;"| Big 12 regular season

|-
!colspan=12 style="background:#CC0000; color:black;"| Big 12 Tournament

Incidents
On February 8, 2014, in the closing minutes of a game at Texas Tech, Oklahoma State player Marcus Smart shoved a Texas Tech fan in the stands after a verbal altercation and received a technical foul.  At a press conference the following afternoon, neither Smart nor OSU coach Travis Ford addressed the question of what the fan said.  OSU announced that Smart would be suspended for 3 games because of the incident.  Separately, Texas Tech announced its findings that the fan had not used a racial slur (as had been reported by some sources) but had spoken  inappropriately to Smart, and the fan agreed not to attend any further Texas Tech games during the 2013-2014 season.

See also
2013–14 Texas Tech Lady Raiders basketball team

References

External links
Official Texas Tech Red Raiders men's basketball page 

Texas Tech Red Raiders basketball seasons
Texas Tech
2014 in sports in Texas
Texas Tech